Val Okimoto is an American politician and educator serving since November 29, 2022 as the member of the Honolulu City Council representing District VIII.  She is a former member and Minority Leader of the Hawaii House of Representatives, serving in that body from 2018 to 2022.  

Okimoto was elected to represent District VIII on the Honolulu City Council, which is the legislative body of the City and County of Honolulu, on November 8, 2022. She was appointed to fill the vacancy caused by the November 8, 2022 resignation of the incumbent, who was elected to the Hawaii Senate, on November 29, 2022.
 
Okimoto previously served as the state Representative for District 36 and is a member of the Republican Party.  Okimoto is a 2019 graduate of the Council of State Governments West - Western Legislative Academy, and is a recipient of a 2020 Elected Women of Excellence Award from the National Foundation for Women Legislators.  She was elected to serve as Minority Leader on February 17, 2021.

Background
Okimoto was born in Lihue, Hawaii. She is of Japanese and Filipino descent. She graduated from high school with honors from Kauai High School. Okimoto earned a bachelor's degree in Accounting with a minor in Business Management from Brigham Young University of Hawaii, and earned her Special Education Teacher Certification at Chaminade University of Honolulu. Okimoto has done mission work for the Church of Jesus Christ of Latter-day Saints in Cebu, Philippines. She is an active member of the community by serving as a Director and Treasurer of the Mililani Town Association (MTA), School Community Council (SCC) board member at Mililani ‘Ike Elementary School, member of the Board of Directors for Hoaloha ‘Ike, Parent and Coach for Mililani American Youth Soccer Organization (AYSO), and served for 4 years as the President of her church's chapter of a woman's organization.

Political career
Okimoto was elected to represent District 36 of the Hawaii House of Representatives, which includes Mililani Mauka, Mililani, and Waipiʻo Acres, on November 6, 2018.  She was re-elected for a second term on November 3, 2020. On November 8, 2022, Okimoto was elected to represent District VIII on the Honolulu City Council.

A social and fiscal conservative, Okimoto opposed gay marriage legislation in 2013 and bills supporting adoption rights for same-sex couples.

Electoral history

Committee assignments
2021-2022 (31st Legislature)
 Committee on Economic Development
 Committee on Education
 Committee on Higher Education & Technology
 Committee on Labor & Tourism
 Committee on Legislative Management (beginning February 17, 2021)

2019-2020 (30th Legislature)
 Committee on Agriculture (2019)
 Committee on Lower & Higher Education
 Committee on Tourism & International Affairs
 Committee on Transportation (2020)

References

21st-century American politicians
21st-century American women politicians
21st-century Mormon missionaries
American women of Japanese descent in politics
Asian conservatism in the United States
Brigham Young University alumni
Hawaii politicians of Japanese descent
Living people
Republican Party members of the Hawaii House of Representatives
People from Lihue, Hawaii
Year of birth missing (living people)